Les Négresses Vertes, which formed in 1987, is a French music group that combines world music  and some aspects of alternative rock. Tracks often feature acoustic guitar and accordion, with some containing other traditional instruments such as piano and brass. The group's style is fairly upbeat and energetic on the majority of its tracks, with unusual rhythms, vocals delivered with a generous dose of zeal and vibrant energy, and accompaniment melodies ranging from lilting and distant to eccentric and fast-paced. These two factors give many of the group's pieces a strong sense of direction.

History
Formed in 1987, Les Négresses Vertes arose from the alternative-music scene in Paris. The original line-up included singer Helno (also known as Helno Rota de Lourcqua, born Noël Rota), Jo Roz (also known as l'Ami Ro; real name Joe Ruffier des Aimes) (piano), Stéfane Mellino (guitar), Jean-Marie Paulus (bass), Gaby (drums), Matthias Canavese (accordion), Michel Ochowiak (trumpet), Abraham Sirinix (also known as Abraham Braham) (trombone), and Iza Mellino (backing vocals).

The original members were a group of friends, many of whom had not played their instruments before forming the band. The group's name translates as green negresses; and  arose from abuse hurled at the members at one of the group's first concerts. The insult is a comparison to the kitsch art of Vladimir Tretchikoff. The group was initially signed to the independent Off the Track label and released the punk protest song "200 Ans D'Hypocrisie" in response to its home country's French Revolution bicentennial celebrations.

In 1989, they released their first album, Mlah, to good reviews in both France and the UK, where the single "Zobi La Mouche" just failed to reach the charts. The group also toured and played the WOMAD festival. The group also made a controversial tour of Lebanon. Their second album, Famille Nombreuse, in 1991, featured new drummer Zé Verbalito.

In 1990, Les Négresses Vertes contributed the song "I love Paris" to the Cole Porter tribute album "Red Hot + Blue", which was produced by the Red Hot Organization.

Helno was by this time struggling with serious heroin addiction, and Stéfane Mellino and Canavese replaced him as the main songwriters. Helno died at his parents' house on 22 January 1993.

Several members left the band after Helno's death, but Les Négresses Vertes continued around the nucleus of Mellino, Canavese, Ochowiak, and Paulus. In 1995, the band released the album Zig-Zague, followed by the live album Green Bus.  By the 2000s Trabendo, the group's style had shifted to a dub-oriented lounge style.

Discography

Albums

 Mlah (1988)
 Famille nombreuse (1991)
 An Aperitif (1994)
 Zig-zague (1994)
 Green Bus (1996), live
 Trabendo (1999)
 Acoustic Clubbing (2001)

Compilations
 10 Remixes (’87–’93) (1993)
 Le Grand Déballage (2002)
 L'essentiel (2004)
 À l’Affiche (2006)

Singles
 Il (1989)
 Zobi La Mouche (1989)
 Voila L’ete (1989)
 "I Love Paris" (1990) (Tribute album "Red Hot + Blue" produced by the Red Hot Organization)
 Face à La Mer (1991)
 Famille Heureuse (1992)
 Hou! Mamma Mia (1992)
 Sous Le soleil de bodega (1992)
 Apres La pluie (1994)
 Mambo Show (1994)
 A Quoi Bon (1995)
 Easy Girls (1999)
 Leila (1999)
 Hasta Llegar (2000) ('Promo' CD - was never released)
 Spank / Abuela (2000)

References

External links
 https://web.archive.org/web/20040325021454/http://www.negressesvertes.com/ 
 http://lnv.esy.es/
 https://web.archive.org/web/20060221055431/http://www.mellino.org/ 
Concert photos by Laurent Orseau (Black Session)

French alternative rock groups
Sire Records artists
Virgin Records artists
Rhythm King artists
Musical groups established in 1987
Musical groups disestablished in 2001
1987 establishments in France
2001 disestablishments in France
Musical groups from Paris